Radu Pamfil (21 August 1951, in Baia Mare – 22 March 2009) was a Romanian football player who played for FC Baia Mare and Dinamo Bucureşti.

In 1982, playing for FC Baia Mare, he started in both the European Cup Winners' Cup matches against Real Madrid of Spain.

References 

1951 births
2009 deaths
Sportspeople from Baia Mare
Romanian footballers
CS Minaur Baia Mare (football) players
Association football midfielders
FC Dinamo București players